Branden Ratcliff, also known as Vindata is a producer/DJ based in Los Angeles. The project was formerly a duo with Jared Poythress. In March 2017, they were featured on Rolling Stones list of 10 New Artists You Need to Know Now. They gained recognition with a single featuring Kenzie May, "All I Really Need." Shortly after, Skrillex signed them to a record deal at Owsla where they released Through Time and Space featuring Kenzie May again as well as Anderson .Paak, Chuck Ellis and Kaleena Zanders and Mack.

Their first official artistic collaboration with Skrillex came in August 2017 with the "uplifting, vibrant", "Favor."

Career and musical style 
In 2013, Vindata released their debut EP titled "For One to Follow" on Symbols Recordings alongside a remix of ODESZA's "Without You". In 2014, they released "Where You Are", a collaboration with Sweater Beats and Bella Hunter. In 2014, they released the song "All I Really Need" as a single featuring Kenzie May. In 2015, they signed to Skrillex's label Owsla with their song "Continuum" featuring on the label's spring compilation album. Their second EP, "Through Time and Space" was released in August the same year, featuring songs such as "Own Life" which received its own remix package with remixes from Shift K3y and Rene LaVice. In 2016, Vindata released the single "Better" with Mija. A music video for the song was also released. They also collaborated with Australian DJ Wax Motif for the song "Crazy". In 2017, they released "Right Now" with Njomza and Alex & Alex.

On November 13, 2021, the departure of Jared Poythress was announced, with Branden Ratcliff continuing Vindata as a solo project.

On June 4, 2021, Vindata released their first album "With Opened Eyes". The lead single for the album was "Let it Go", released January 29 of that year.  On February 16, "Good 4 Me" and "Union" was released as a joint-single, with the latter song being featured on the Rocket League title screen soundtrack. The entire album was available for streaming the upload of its final single "Skin (I Give Into You)".

Discography

Albums

Extended plays

Singles

Remixes 
2012
 Little Dragon – Little Man (Vindata Remix)
2013
 ODESZA – Without You (Vindata Remix)
2014
 Jack Ü – Take Ü There (Vindata Remix)
 Ellie Goulding – Beating Heart (Vindata Remix)
 Alex Metric – Heart Weighs a Ton (Vindata Remix)
 Camden Arc – Is It Good To You (Vindata Remix)
2015
 Hoodboi – By Ur Side (Vindata Remix)
 Clean Bandit – Stronger (Vindata Remix)
2016
 Kenzie May – Never Find Another (Vindata Remix)

References 

Musical groups from Los Angeles
African-American DJs
American electronic music groups
Electronic music duos
American musical duos
Owsla artists
Monstercat artists